Saptasajya  is a 1950 Ollywood/Oriya film directed by Kalyan Gupta.

Cast
 Giridhari
 Pankaj Nanda
 Ratikant Nayak
 Anima Pedini
 Kishori Rajendra
 Kamala Sen
 Byomkesh Tripathi
 Bhagaban Mohanty
 Tunia

Soundtrack 
 "Rangi Dhana Kie Luti Neichi Lo Bata Re"

References

External links

Saptasajya on Moviebuff

1950 films
1950 drama films
1950s Odia-language films
Indian black-and-white films